Mountaire Farms is the fourth-largest producer of chicken in the United States, with headquarters in Millsboro, Delaware. The company operates internationally, serving the United States and foreign markets as far away as Asia. Mountaire Farms has facilities in the states of Arkansas, Delaware, Maryland, North Carolina, and Virginia. The company has about 7,000 employees and plays a major part in the economy of Delaware.

History
What became Mountaire Farms was founded in Arkansas in 1914 by Guy Cameron, who started a local feed business. His son Ted Cameron built four feed mills in the 1950s to serve local growers. In 1959, the company started processing chickens, with Mountaire Poultry, Inc. incorporated in 1964. The company was incorporated as Mountaire Corporation in 1971. Ron Cameron, the son of Ted Cameron, became president and CEO of the company in 1975.

In 1977, Mountaire Farms expanded operations to Delaware when it purchased H&H Poultry in Selbyville. The company acquired Piedmont Poultry in Lumber Bridge, North Carolina in 1996. In 2000, Mountaire Farms purchased operations from Townsends, including Central Grain Facilities, in Millsboro, Delaware. The same year, the company built a new feed mill in Candor, North Carolina. In 2003, Mountaire Farms bought the Tyson feed mill in Princess Anne, Maryland. The company acquired operations from Hostetter Grain Facilities in Trappe, Maryland, Queen Anne, Maryland, and Seaford, Delaware in 2007. In 2009, Mountaire Farms bought Mauney Grain in New London, North Carolina. The company acquired Carmean Grain Facilities in Ridgely, Maryland in 2011. In 2012, Mountaire Farms bought Gavilon Grain in Townsend, Delaware. The company took over the Townsend/Omtron Hatchery in Siler City, North Carolina in 2013. Mountaire Farms bought Star Milling in Statesville, North Carolina in 2014, which became their Breeder Feed Mill. In 2016, the company bought a former processing plant in Siler City, with plans to renovate and update the plant. In October of that year, Mountaire Farms opened a new Corporate Office Building in Millsboro. In 2017, the company acquired Lansing Trade Group, LLC, which has operations in Eastville and Painter in Virginia.

COVID-19 outbreak
While the company had a "coronavirus task force" before finding any cases, in April and May 2020 the company's Selbyville, Delaware plant became a hotspot for an outbreak of COVID-19, with the UFCW stating there are 40 cases. Sam Wilson, a Sussex County, Delaware councilman, called further testing at county poultry processing plants "a dumb idea" because they were "losing millions of dollars".

Other processing plants with positive cases include nine cases at a Lumber Bridge, North Carolina plant. Eleven cases were found at a 1500-employee processing plant Siler City, North Carolina, leading Piedmont Health and the North Carolina National Guard to test more employees and family members, which led to a total of 74 positive tests out of 356 tested.

Political contributions
Mountaire Farms was the fifth largest contributor to the 2016 Trump campaign.
In 2018 Mountaire contributed 7.7 million dollars towards GOP efforts in that years midterm elections, which bought Mountaire CEO Ronald Cameron access to The White House on the day of the election to watch the election results.
Ronald Cameron, "head" of Mountaire Farms, was appointed to the President Trump's advisory committee on the pandemic.

References

External links
Official website

Agriculture companies of the United States
Food manufacturers of the United States
Companies based in Sussex County, Delaware
Food and drink companies established in 1914
1914 establishments in Arkansas
Agriculture in Delaware
Agriculture companies established in 1914
American companies established in 1914
Millsboro, Delaware